Sexual evolution may refer to:
Evolution of sex
Sexual selection